Honsocker Knob is a summit in West Virginia, in the United States.

Honsocker Knob most likely derives its name from the local Handsucker family.

References

Mountains of Wetzel County, West Virginia
Mountains of West Virginia